Ga-Ramakara is a village in Ga-Matlala in the Polokwane Local Municipality of the Capricorn District Municipality of the Limpopo province of South Africa. It is located 44 km northwest of Polokwane on the Matlala Road.

Education 
 Konkoti Primary School.
 Kwena-A-Peu Secondary School.

References 

Populated places in the Polokwane Local Municipality